The Buzzman L'il Buzzard is a Canadian, two seat side-by-side configuration, high wing, strut-braced, conventional landing gear, tractor configuration, ultralight aircraft, originally manufactured by Buzzman ARVS and later by L'il Hustler Ultralight Aviation of Holland Landing, Ontario. The aircraft is sold mostly assembled, less only paint, engine and instruments.

The aircraft is unusual in that the manufacturer offers the airframe for sale without any warranty and without shipping insurance.

Design and development
A development of the 1982 vintage Anglin J6 Karatoo, the L'il Buzzard was introduced in 1990. The design goals included low-cost, durability in the trainer role, fast construction time and ease of maintenance. Because it is not on the list of approved advanced ultralights and, being delivered fully assembled is not eligible for registration as an amateur-built aircraft, Canadian registered L'il Buzzards are basic ultralights.

The aircraft is constructed with a welded 4130 steel tube fuselage and aluminium wings, built up from a D-cell on an I-beam spar. The aircraft is covered with painted aircraft fabric. The wing is braced by a V-strut with jury struts. The landing gear is of taildragger configuration, with bungee suspended main wheels and a sprung, steerable tailwheel.

The aircraft comes with float fittings welded onto the airframe and can also be operated on skis. The standard engine is the  Rotax 582, but engines up to  can be fitted.

The company claims a 40-hour assembly time from the supplied completed airframe to install the engine and paint the aircraft.

Operational history
The manufacturer claimed that by 2002 one hundred aircraft had been delivered to customers. In November 2016 there were 19 L'il Buzzard variants registered in Canada, comprising 15 L'il Buzzards, two L'il Hustlers and two L'il Hustler SS models.

Variants
L'il Buzzard
Basic version with a  Rotax 582 engine.
L'il Buzzard TWS 582
Improved version with a  Rotax 582 engine.
Lil Hustler
Equipped with an  Rotax 912UL engine.
Lil Hustler SS
Equipped with a  Rotax 912ULS engine.
L'il Hustler TR
Tricycle gear version

Specifications (L'il Buzzard)

See also

References

External links

1990s Canadian ultralight aircraft
High-wing aircraft
Single-engined tractor aircraft